Paul Simpson may refer to:

Paul Simpson (footballer) (born 1966), ex-football player turned manager
Paul Simpson (musician), musician, vocalist, lyricist and writer from Liverpool, England
Paul Hardrock Simpson (1904–1978), ultra distance runner